Taddle Creek is a buried stream in Toronto, Ontario, Canada that flowed a southeasterly course about six kilometres long, from St. Clair Avenue west of Bathurst Street through the present site of Wychwood Park, through the University of Toronto, into the Toronto Harbour near the Distillery District. During the 19th century, it was buried and converted into an underground sewer, but traces of the creek can still be found today. The scenic footpath known as Philosopher's Walk follows the ravine created by the creek from the Royal Ontario Museum to Trinity College. Taddle Creek is also the name of a Toronto literary magazine and of a local Montessori school.

History
In the 1790s, the original town site of the Town of York was established along its south bank. Its waters would be used by its first industries. The disappearance of the creek came in phases in the 19th century:
 east of Church Street - before 1860
 Elizabeth Street to Church Street - early 1866
 University of Toronto sections including McCaul's Pond - 1886

There is no exact origin for the creek's name but there are three possible theories:
 named for the Tattle family of Toronto
 named for the tadpoles that filled the creek
 onomatopoeic link of an English northcountry dialect variant of toddle meaning "to move with a gentle sound, as a stream or river"

Taddle Creek had other names during the 19th Century:
 Little Don River
 Brewery Creek - named for Enoch Turner's brewery
 Goodwin Creek
 University Creek
 Wolz Creek - east of Jarvis after brewer Mr. Woltz

Taddle Creek Park

Taddle Creek Park is a small but busy park at the southwest corner of Lowther Avenue and Bedford Road, in The Annex area of Toronto. The park was created in 1976, on what had been the site of the home of Nobel laureate Frederick Banting, and beside the home of Beatrice Worsley (the first female computer scientist in Canada).

See also
 Taddle Creek (magazine)
 University of Toronto
 List of rivers of Ontario

References

External links 
 Lost Rivers entry on Taddle Creek
 Taddle Creek magazine

Rivers of Toronto
Subterranean rivers